is a single-member constituency of the House of Representatives in the Diet of Japan. It covers Northern central parts of Fukuoka including the city of Iizuka, home to the Asō family (Asō Corp./KK) and Tarō Asō, Liberal Democratic Party (LDP) faction leader and the only representative for the 8th district since its creation. He was elected LDP president in 2008 against Kaoru Yosano (without faction) and three other candidates, but resigned one year later following the most devastating general election result in party history – his successor would be the second LDP president in history not to become prime minister after his election. Yet, Asō carried his own district by an overwhelming margin in 2009.

In detail, the district consists of the cities of Nōgata, Iizuka, Kama, Nakama, Miyawaka and the counties of Onga, Kurate and Kaho. As of 2012, 367,966 eligible voters were registered in the district.

Before the electoral reform of 1994, the area had been part of the multi-member Fukuoka 2nd district that elected five Representatives by single non-transferable vote, among them from 1979 to 1983 and since 1986 Tarō Asō.

List of representatives

Election results

References 

Fukuoka Prefecture
Districts of the House of Representatives (Japan)